Omnipop (It's Only a Flesh Wound Lambchop) is the eighth studio album by American singer-songwriter Sam Phillips. The album's subtitle is a quote from the film The Producers.

Reception 
Omnipop was a critical and commercial flop, selling only about a quarter as many copies as its predecessor, Martinis & Bikinis, and receiving several negative reviews from music critics. In one such review, the Chicago Tribunes Mark Caro wrote that the album's "lyrics are more pronouncements than personal revelations, and [Phillips'] observations are less insightful than broad and ornery."

Track listing

Personnel 
source:
 Sam Phillips – vocals, guitar, Chamberlin
 Darrell Leonard – trumpet
 Les Lovitt – flugelhorn, trumpet
 Kenneth Kugler – trombone
 Ira Nepus – trombone
 Steve Williams – trombone
 Suzette Moriarty – French horn
 Patrick Warren – Chamberlin
 Matt Betton – marimba
 Smokey Hormel – guitar
 Greg Leisz – guitar
 Marc Ribot – guitar
 Todd Vincent – guitar
 Jon Brion – Chamberlin, piano, guitar, bass guitar, drums
 Armando Compean – bass guitar
 Brad Hauser – bass guitar
 Jerry Scheff – bass guitar
 Matt Chamberlain – drums, percussion
 Don Heffington – drums, maracas
 Jim Keltner – drums, percussion
 Josh LaBelle – drums, dumbek
 Paulinho da Costa – bongos

References 

1996 albums
Sam Phillips (musician) albums
Albums produced by T Bone Burnett
Virgin Records albums